Juan Daniel "Dani" Cáceres Rivas (born 6 October 1973) is a Paraguayan football defender.

Career
Cáceres started his playing career in the youth divisions of Club Sport Colombia of Paraguay before playing for other Paraguayan clubs in the first division. He also played for Flamengo of Brazil and several teams from Argentina.

Cáceres also played for the Paraguay national football team, and was part of the squad that participated in the 1999 and 2001 Copa America tournaments.

Career statistics

International goals

References

External links
 Juan Daniel Caceres Website

1973 births
Living people
Paraguayan footballers
Association football defenders
Cerro Porteño players
Club Guaraní players
Club Olimpia footballers
Club Atlético Huracán footballers
CR Flamengo footballers
Estudiantes de La Plata footballers
Club Atlético Belgrano footballers
Expatriate footballers in Argentina
Expatriate footballers in Brazil
1999 Copa América players
2001 Copa América players
Paraguay international footballers